Talos Dome (sometimes spelled Thalos Dome) is a large ice dome rising to 2,300 m to the southwest of the Usarp Mountains in Antarctica. The dome overlies the east margin of the Wilkes Subglacial Basin. The feature was delineated by the Scott Polar Research Institute (SPRI)-National Science Foundation (NSF)-Technical University of Denmark (TUD) airborne radio echo sounding program, 1967–79, and was named after Talos of Greek mythology, who assisted Minos in the defense of Crete.

See also
 List of Antarctic field camps

References
 

Ice caps of Antarctica
Bodies of ice of Oates Land